Goranci is the village in Bosnia and Herzegovina, near Mostar, part of Mostar municipality.

The name Goranci does not have a direct link to the ethnic group Goranci in Serbia.

Settlements around Goranci are Bogodol, Crnač, Drežnica, Gradac, Knešpolje, Mostar, Polog, Raška Gora, Široki Brijeg, Vrdi, Grabova Draga and Sovići.

Demographics 
In 1991 village had 509 people:

Croats - 472 (92.73%)
Serbs - 36 (7.07%)
other - 1 (0.20%)

According to the 2013 census, its population was 175, all Croats.

References

Populated places in Mostar
Villages in the Federation of Bosnia and Herzegovina